Keko was born Rayon Payne, in Guyana and he's known by many names NSX, The Gorilla, Junior Payne just to name a few. He's a radio host who made his mark in radio when he founded the pirate radio station 95Live 95.9 in Orlando Florida. Keko hosted a talk show called Afternoon Crash, the station had a strong grassroots following until the FCC  stepped in and indicted him for operating a radio station without a license. He was subsequently sentenced to prison 9 months for a federal misdemeanor.
Shortly after completing his prison sentence, he founded Myspace Radio.
It was his hope to get back into radio, but that was short-lived when Myspace, Inc. filed a complaint with National Arbitration Forum over the name, and the National Arbitration Forum ruled against him. 
With his frustration with radio he wanted to try something new, so he tred his skills at talent management and he began representing the NY Giants  player Jay Bromley  which was a rocky start with scandal Jay Bromley was accuse of rape. But it wasn't long Keko was back into the space which he is more comfortable and that is radio. In 2018 he started doing the Folksalert Podcast  which is available on all podcast platform.

Radio career

 95Live: 1998 – 2002
 Myspace Radio: 2004 – 2007
 Gotfolks: 2005–Present 
 Folksalert: 2007–Present

In 2019 Keko release Gorilla Pimping album a combination of the best of his podcast and music from well known recording artist such as Compton Menace, 2eleven, Freddie Gibbs, Mouth Piece just to know a few. The song Folksalert  which was inspired because of the Folksalert brand is a well known song with pimps.

Discography

Albums
2019 Gorilla Pimping

Singles
 Folksalert

External links
Preddy Boy P x Pooh Hefner - Folks Alert ft. BlueJeans (Official Video)

References

Guyanese radio presenters
Living people
1974 births
People from Georgetown, Guyana